Gabriele Hooffacker (born February 10, 1959) is a German journalist, journalism teacher and a professor for specifics of media at Leipzig University of Applied Science. Her research interests are online media as well as interactive and participative formats in journalism.

Life
Gabriele Hooffacker studied Historical Sciences, German studies and economics at the Ludwig Maximilian University of Munich. Meanwhile, she was employee of Monumenta Germaniae Historica.

She has been dealing with the new media since the early eighties. In 1987 she founded CL-Net (later part of the APC), a computer-based grassroots organization for citizens who wanted to use the internet as a tool for political and cultural interaction. In 1988 she set up her own company, now called Foundation Journalists-Academy Dr. Hooffacker, which is a Journalism school and a consultancy on new media issues. Her works include several publications on online journalism, teaching journalism and the societal dimension of the internet.

Hooffacker writes for the online magazines onlinejournalismus.de, Telepolis and others. She deals primarily with the themes of teaching journalism, online journalism, Internet culture, Internet and right-wing radicalism. Hooffacker is member of the jury of “Alternativer Medienpreis”. She publishes the book series "Journalistische Praxis", which was founded by Walther von La Roche. In 2018, Gabriele Hooffacker is co-founder of the bilingual journalism journal "Journalistik" for journalism research.

Publications (extract) 
 (with Klaus Meier): La Roches Einführung in den praktischen Journalismus: Mit genauer Beschreibung aller Ausbildungswege Deutschland · Österreich · Schweiz, Springer VS, Wiesbaden 2017, 
 (with Wolfgang Kenntemich and Uwe Kulisch): Die neue Öffentlichkeit. Wie Bots, Bürger und Big Data den Journalismus verändern. Springer VS, Wiesbaden 2018, 
 (with Cornelia Wolf): Technische Innovationen – Medieninnovationen? Herausforderungen für Kommunikatoren, Konzepte und Nutzerforschung. Springer VS, Wiesbaden 2016, 
 Gabriele Hooffacker / Peter Lokk: Pressearbeit praktisch. Ein Handbuch für Ausbildung und Praxis, Journalistische Praxis, 1. Auflage Berlin 2011, 
 Gabriele Hooffacker (ed.): Journalismus lehren, München 2010, 
 Gabriele Hooffacker: Online-Journalismus. Online-Journalismus. Schreiben und Konzipieren für das Internet. Ein Handbuch für Ausbildung und Praxis, Journalistische Praxis, 1. Aufl. München 2001, 4. Auf. Springer VS, Wiesbaden 2015, 
 Gabriele Hooffacker: Wir nutzen Netze. Ein kommunikatives Manifest, Steidl Verlag, Göttingen 1995, 
 Gabriele Hooffacker: Avaritia radix omnium malorum (Mikrokosmos 19), Peter Lang Verlag, Frankfurt am Main 1986,

External links
 
 Interview with Ronda Hauben on netizen journalism
 foundation Journalists-Academy Dr. Hooffacker

References 

German journalists
Journalism teachers
German women writers
German women academics
1959 births
Living people